Joseph Di Pasquale is an Italian architect.

Biographical notes
Graduated magna cum laude in architecture at Politecnico di Milano in 1991. He has been contract professor at the Faculty of Architecture and Society at Politecnico di Milano from 2009 to 2015. He started his professional practice in 1992. In 2001 he studied Film Directing in New York Film Academy. His professional practice JDP Architects operates in Europe and China. In 2019 he got a "cum laude" PhD at Politecnico di Milano with the thesis: "Hybrid Modular Architecture: a strategic framework of building innovation for emerging housing behaviors in urban contexts".

Career
Di Pasquale claims a lack of identity in contemporary globalized architecture, considers himself an architectural storyteller and a seeker of new interpretations for the contemporary city. In the book "Dense City" he identifies a structural relationship between urban density and cultural identity in urban fabric and architecture. He states "the contemporary city is no longer able to generate significant urban space because the modern architecture has abandoned the idea of "facade", which means the idea to orient the buildings, therefore the city no longer looks toward its space, but it's made by architectures that are meant to be looked upon as single sculptures or objects". Since 2008, he has produced several works on cultural dissemination with lectures and conferences in Italy, China, Russia and the United States. He has been an observer of the historical meeting between Chinese tradition and the western contemporary society in the early 21st century. In 2013, he declared to the Il Sole 24 Ore that contemporary Chinese society and architecture are "seeking the contemporary transposition of its millenary tradition". Di Pasquale is the author of many articles in "L'Arca International" magazine. In his academic research he defines and
investigates hybrid modular systems and concepts in terms of process innovation linked with the ongoing deep changes of lifestyles and housing habits in contemporaneity.

Competitions and projects

He won several national and international competitions of architecture, among which the Tianjin Eco Town and the Guangzhou Circle, opened in 2013, that CNN listed in the 10 most interesting buildings that will appear in 2014 worldwide. Other relevant projects are Gewiss production plant, Intercos, Polini, Valsir, Aerea headquarter, amusement park of Minitalia Leolandia in Turate (Italy), and the masterplan Choruslife Bergamo in 2016.

Publications 
 2008. Emergenza/tessuto, appunti per una metodologia della composizione architettonica.
 2010. La città densa. Identità urbana e densità edilizia.
 2014. City manifesto. Buildings, architecture and urban design works at AM Project Milan.
 2014. Pop-up hotel Expo 2015. Temporaneità come condizione permanente.
 2015. Lost in Globalization. The paradigm of Chinese urban housing.
 2015. Scalable Modular Architecture. A dynamic Housing for a changing society.
 2017. Typological and Technological innovation for the application of hybrid systems to housing construction. In: TECHNE vol.13.

Awards 
 WGDO World Green Design Contribution Award 2015 for Guangzhou Circle Building. 
 WT Smart City Award 2017 given by Città Metropolitana di Milano for Chorus Life.
 ICONIC LANDSCAPE AWARD 2018 for design of CHORUSLIFE HOTEL, released by international forum Eco Green Tech, Topscape and Paysage magazines.

References

Architects from Milan
Urban theorists
Italian architecture writers
Italian male non-fiction writers
Modernist architects from Italy
Architectural theoreticians
1968 births
Living people